Hofsee (Zurow) is a lake in the Nordwestmecklenburg district in Mecklenburg-Vorpommern, Germany. At an elevation of 49.2 m, its surface area is 0.1 km2.

Lakes of Mecklenburg-Western Pomerania